The 1999 Tour de Romandie was the 53rd edition of the Tour de Romandie cycle race and was held from 4 May to 9 May 1999. The race started in Bernex and finished in Geneva. The race was won by Laurent Jalabert of the ONCE team.

General classification

References

1999
Tour de Romandie